The 1925 Tennessee Volunteers football team (variously "Tennessee", "UT" or the "Vols") was an American football team that represented the University of Tennessee as a member of the Southern Conference during the 1925 season. In its fifth and final year under head coach M. B. Banks, Tennessee compiled a 5–2–1 record (2–2–1 against conference opponents), finished in 12th place in the conference, shut out four of eight opponents, and outscored all opponents by a total of 129 to 73. The team played its home games at Shields–Watkins Field in Knoxville, Tennessee.

Schedule

References

Tennessee
Tennessee Volunteers football seasons
Tennessee Volunteers football